Austria competed at the 1992 Summer Olympics in Barcelona, Spain. 102 competitors, 71 men and 31 women, took part in 68 events in 17 sports.

Medalists

Competitors
The following is the list of number of competitors in the Games.

Athletics

Men's 100m metres
Andreas Berger 
 Heat — DSQ (→ did not advance)

Men's Marathon
 Helmut Schmuck — 2:23.38 (→ 47th place)

Men's 50 km Walk
Stefan Wogerbauer — 4:17:25 (→ 26th place)

Men's Hammer Throw
Johann Linder 
 Qualification — 75.28 m
 Final — 75.14 m (→ 9th place)

Men's Shot Put
Klaus Bodenmuller 
 Qualification — 19.86 m
 Final — 20.48 m (→ 6th place)

Women's High Jump
 Sigrid Kirchmann 
 Qualification — 1.92 m
 Final — 1.94 m (→ 5th place)

Women's Long Jump
 Ljudmila Ninova-Rudoll 
 Heat — 6.53 m (→ did not advance)

Women's Discus Throw
 Ursula Weber
 Heat — 51.62m (→ did not advance)

Badminton

Canoeing

Cycling

Five cyclists, all men, represented Austria in 1992.

Men's road race
 Peter Luttenberger
 Andreas Langl
 Georg Totschnig

Men's 1 km time trial
 Christian Meidlinger

Men's points race
 Franz Stocher

Diving

Men's 3m Springboard
Niki Stajković
 Preliminary Round — 339.75 points (→ did not advance, 22nd place)
Jürgen Richter
 Preliminary Round — 336.78 points (→ did not advance, 24th place)

Equestrianism

Fencing

Men's foil
 Benny Wendt
 Anatol Richter
 Michael Ludwig

Men's team foil
 Benny Wendt, Anatol Richter, Michael Ludwig, Robert Blaschka, Merten Mauritz

Handball

Women's Team Competition
Preliminary Round (Group B)
 Austria – Spain 20-16
 Austria – South Korea 27-27
 Austria – Norway 17-19
Classification Match
 5th/6th place: Austria – United States 26-17 (→ Fifth place)
Team Roster
Stanka Bozovic
Slavica Đukić
Jadranka Jez
Kerstin Jönsson
Leona Kloud
Jasna Kolar-Merdan
Sandra Mamoli
Edith Matei
Iris Morhammer
Nicole Peissl
Karin Prokop
Marianna Racz
Natali Rusnatchenko
Barbara Strass
Liliana Topea
Teresa Zurowski
Head coach: Vinco Kandija

Judo

Rowing

Sailing

Men

Open

Shooting

Men

Women

Open

Swimming

Men's 100m Butterfly
 Alexander Brandl
 Heat – 55.45 (→ did not advance, 26th place)

Men's 200m Butterfly
 Alexander Brandl
 Heat – 2:02.88 (→ did not advance, 32nd place)

Women's 100m Breaststroke
 Martina Nemec
 Heat – 1:13.34 (→ did not advance, 25th place)

Women's 200m Breaststroke
 Martina Nemec
 Heat – 2:36.65 (→ did not advance, 25th place)

Women's 200m Individual Medley
 Martina Nemec
 Heat – 2:22.63 (→ did not advance, 27th place)

Synchronized swimming

Two synchronized swimmers represented Austria in 1992.

Women's solo
 Beatrix Müllner
 Christine Müllner

Women's duet
 Beatrix Müllner
 Christine Müllner

Table tennis

Tennis

Men's Singles Competition:
 Thomas Muster
 First Round — Lost to Henri Leconte (France) 6-7, 6-7, 4-6
 Horst Skoff
 First Round — Lost to Magnus Larsson (Sweden) 2-6, 2-6, 3-6

Women's Singles Competition
 Barbara Paulus
 First Round – Defeated Monique Javer (Great Britain) 6-7, 6-4, 6-3
 Second Round – Lost to Anke Huber (Germany) 4-6, 1-6
 Petra Ritter
 First Round – Lost to Eugenia Maniokova (Unified Team) 1-6, 6-7

Wrestling

References

Nations at the 1992 Summer Olympics
1992
Summer Olympics